Utricularia andongensis is a small, probably perennial, carnivorous plant that belongs to the genus Utricularia. It is endemic to tropical Africa, where it can be found in Angola, Cameroon, the Central African Republic, the Democratic Republic of the Congo, Gabon, Guinea, Liberia, Nigeria, Sierra Leone, Sudan, Tanzania, Togo, Uganda, and Zambia. It was originally named by Friedrich Welwitsch but formally described and published by William Philip Hiern in 1900.

See also 
 List of Utricularia species

References 

Carnivorous plants of Africa
Flora of Angola
Flora of Cameroon
Flora of Gabon
Flora of Guinea
Flora of Liberia
Flora of Nigeria
Flora of Sierra Leone
Flora of Sudan
Flora of Tanzania
Flora of the Central African Republic
Flora of the Democratic Republic of the Congo
Flora of Togo
Flora of Uganda
Flora of Zambia
andongensis
Plants described in 1900